Abominations of Desolation is the demo album by American death metal band Morbid Angel. While it was originally recorded in May 1986, the band did not release it at the time due to their dissatisfaction with the final product. These recordings would later be released in 1991 at the decision of the band's record label, Earache Records.

It is specified on the cover that it was intended to be their first full-length album, yet unreleased, which would make Altars of Madness their proper debut. The band recorded and initially promoted the album under this pretense, but the plans were shelved after Mike Browning left the band in 1986 due to an altercation with Trey Azagthoth. Trey has said in interviews that Abominations of Desolation is not really an album and should be considered a longer-than-standard demo.

Most of the songs were reworked and appeared on later Morbid Angel albums. "Chapel of Ghouls", "Lord of All Fevers and Plague", and "Welcome to Hell" (renamed "Evil Spells") can be heard on Altars of Madness. "Unholy Blasphemies", "Abominations" and "Azagthoth" (renamed "The Ancient Ones") are on Blessed Are the Sick. "Angel of Disease" was recorded for Covenant, and lastly, "Hell Spawn" finally appeared on Formulas Fatal to the Flesh as "Hellspawn: The Rebirth". To date, "Demon Seed" is the only song from these sessions that has not been re-recorded for a full-length album.

Track listing

Personnel 
Morbid Angel
 Mike Browning – drums, vocals
 Trey Azagthoth – guitars
 Richard Brunelle – guitars
 John Ortega – bass
Additional personnel
 Mark Craven – artwork
 L. Barry – layout

References

Morbid Angel albums
Combat Records albums
1991 albums
Earache Records albums